Magnetic North is an album by Iain Archer, the follow-up album to 2004's Flood The Tanks. Both "When It Kicks In" and "Soleil" were released as singles.

Track listing

References

2006 albums
Iain Archer albums